Romain Maitre is a Grand Prix motorcycle racer from France. He competes in the Endurance FIM World Cup aboard a Kawasaki ZX-10R.

Career statistics

By season

Races by year

References

External links
 Profile on motogp.com

1988 births
Living people
French motorcycle racers
125cc World Championship riders
FIM Superstock 1000 Cup riders